"Mirage" is a single by American singer-songwriter Alexandra Savior. It was released on February 3, 2017 via Columbia Records, as the fourth single from her debut album Belladonna of Sadness.

Personnel
 Alexandra Savior – lead vocals
 Alex Turner – guitars, bass, keyboards, synthesizers
 James Ford – keyboards, synthesizers, drums, percussion

References

2016 songs
Alexandra Savior songs
Songs written by Alex Turner (musician)
Columbia Records singles
Song recordings produced by James Ford (musician)
Songs written by Alexandra Savior